Roodt-sur-Eisch is a village in the commune of Habscht, in western Luxembourg.  , the village has a population of 210.

Villages in Luxembourg
Septfontaines